"Gotta Get Home" is a single taken from Expatriate's debut album In the Midst of This. There were no single releases of this song on CD, vinyl or download, nor was there a video made for the song, however the song was played heavily on radio stations to promote the album. The song was also featured on the In the Midst of This DJ sampler CD, which features all the singles off the album plus "Gotta Get Home". The track was also on the voting list for Triple J's Hottest 100 along with "Play a Part" and "Crazy". It is featured in the Netflix series Russian Doll.

References

2000 songs
Expatriate (band) songs